is a parody instructional book by Koji Aihara and Kentaro Takekuma.

Publication history
In Japan, the series was originally serialized in  Shogakukan's Big Comic Spirits. Shogakukan later published the manga's three tankōbon volumes between October 1990 and May 1992.

In the US, the series was serialized in Viz Media's Pulp from May 2001 to August 2002.

It is licensed in North America by Viz Media.

Reception
Pat King from Animefringe commends the manga for its "excellent parody of the manga industry" and its artwork that "would be right at home in classic issues of Mad Magazine". Johanna Draper Carlson from Comics Worth Reading comments on the "vulgar but funny" adult contents of the manga with its "nudity and various scatological gags". Carlo Santos commends the manga for its "rundown of every major genre, by demographic" and praises the manga above other "How-to Art" books.

Canadian cartoonist and writer Bryan Lee O'Malley described the book as a significant influence on the art style of his Scott Pilgrim graphic novel series.

References

External links

 

1990 manga
Manga creation in anime and manga
Parody anime and manga
Seinen manga
Shogakukan manga
Viz Media manga